Swazi Express Airways was an airline based in Swaziland and owned by Steffen Air Charter Services.

History 

The airline was established in 1995. It was then called Steffen Air, and later changed to Swazi Express Airways. The airline started operations in 1995 with a Cessna 210 (5 seater aircraft) with flights covering the following destinations: Matsapha (Swaziland), Maputo (Mozambique), and Vilanculos (Mozambique). In 1998 the Cessna 210 was upgraded to Cessna Caravan, (11 seater) and a new destination was added: Durban (South Africa). In 2002 the Cessna Caravan was upgraded to a Metro III, 19 seater.

Swazi Express ceased flight operations on 4 April 2008.

Former destinations 

 Swaziland (Matsapha Airport) - hub
 Maputo, Mozambique (Maputo International Airport)
 Vilanculos, Mozambique
 Durban, South Africa
 Johannesburg, South Africa

Cargo services

Type of cargo: parcels, express documents and mail.

Services available on routes:

Durban (South Africa)
Maputo International Airport - Maputo (Mozambique)
Matsapha Airport (Swaziland) (hub)
Vilanculos (Mozambique)

Fleet 
The Swazi Express Airways fleet consisted of the following aircraft (as of February 2008):

1 ATR 42-300
1 Fairchild Metro III

As of February 2008, the average age of the Swazi Express Airways fleet was 19.6 years 
().

References

External links
Swazi Express Airways Fleet

Airlines established in 1995
Airlines disestablished in 2008
Airlines formerly banned in the European Union
Defunct airlines of Eswatini
1995 establishments in Swaziland
2008 disestablishments in Africa